The Troy Meeting House, also known as the Troy Union Church, is a historic church at 514 Bangor Road (Maine State Route 9) in Troy, Maine.  Built in 1840, it is a fine example of transitional vernacular Greek Revival-Gothic Revival architecture, and an enduring symbol of the religious life of the community.  It was listed on the National Register of Historic Places in 2011.

Description and history
The Troy Meeting House is located in a small crossroads hamlet known as Troy Corner, formed by the junction of Bangor Road (the major east-west route through Troy) and Ward Hill and Bagley Hill Roads.  It is set a short way east of this junction, on the south side of Bangor Road, in a small open lot now surrounded by forest.  It is a modest single-story wood frame structure, with a gabled roof, clapboard siding, and a granite foundation.  It has a timber frame built out of hand-hewn members, and was built using traditional scribe-rule methods.  The building corners have pilasters with lancet-arched paneling, which rise to a simple entablature.  The front facade is symmetrical, with a pair of entrances flanking a central sash window.  The entrances are topped by lancet-arched trim and flanked by paneled pilasters similar to those on the building corners.  A single-stage square tower rises above, with rectangular louvered openings and a pinnacles at the corners above.

The church was built in 1840 as a non-denominational "union" church, available for use by any local denomination.  It was probably built by members of the Troy Meeting House Society, and has served the community as a religious meeting place since then, except for a seven-year period of closure during World War II.  It is the community's oldest church, and its only 19th-century church building still in ecclesiastical use.

See also
National Register of Historic Places listings in Waldo County, Maine

References

Churches in Waldo County, Maine
Churches on the National Register of Historic Places in Maine
Gothic Revival architecture in Maine
Greek Revival architecture in Maine
Churches completed in 1840
National Register of Historic Places in Waldo County, Maine